Tanypeza longimana is a species of fly in the family Tanypezidae. It is found in Europe.

References

Nerioidea
Insects described in 1820
Taxa named by Carl Fredrik Fallén
Diptera of Europe